René Marsiglia (17 September 1959 – 25 September 2016) was a football defender and most recently the manager of Nîmes Olympique. He was born in Aubagne, France.

Marsiglia was named head coach of OGC Nice on 15 November 2011. Before that he was assistant coach at the club. He was sacked on 21 May 2012, despite having  saved Nice from relegation that year.

On 26 June 2012, Marsiglia was named head coach of the UAE side Dubai Club.

On 26 December 2013, he became the new coach of Nîmes Olympique in replacement of Victor Zvunka. He died on 25 September 2016, after a long illness.

References

1959 births
2016 deaths
People from Aubagne
Sportspeople from Bouches-du-Rhône
Association football defenders
French footballers
Lille OSC players
RC Lens players
OGC Nice players
Amiens SC players
Ligue 1 players
Ligue 2 players
French football managers
OGC Nice managers
Ligue 1 managers
Expatriate football managers in the United Arab Emirates
Amiens SC managers
AS Cannes managers
Nîmes Olympique managers
Dubai Club managers
Footballers from Provence-Alpes-Côte d'Azur